The Land Shark (also land shark, landshark, LandShark) was a recurring character from the sketch comedy television series Saturday Night Live.

The character first appeared in the fall of 1975 as a response to the release of the film Jaws and the subsequent hysteria over purported shark sightings. It was one of the most popular and imitated sketches of SNL first season.

Original sketch
The Land Shark first appeared in a sketch entitled "Jaws II" on the Candice Bergen-hosted episode (season 1 episode 4), which originally aired on November 8, 1975. As narrated by Don Pardo (the announcer):
the Land Shark is considered the cleverest of all sharks. Unlike the Great White shark, which tends to inhabit the waters and harbors of recreational beach areas, the Land Shark may strike at any place, any time. It is capable of disguising its voice, and generally preys on young, single women.

The sketch depicted the Land Shark (voiced by Chevy Chase) attacking several people after knocking on their doors, pretending to be repairmen, door-to-door salesmen, and the like. Once the intended victim opens the door, the Land Shark quickly enters and attacks them. The sketch is typified by the following exchange:

[Scene: Interior. A New York City apartment. There is a knock at the door.]
Woman:  [speaking through closed door] Yes?
Voice:  (mumbling) Mrs. Arlsburgerhhh?
Woman:  Who?
Voice:  (mumbling) Mrs. Johannesburrrr? 
Woman:  Who is it?
Voice:  [pause] Flowers.
Woman:  Flowers for whom?
Voice:  [long pause] Plumber, ma'am.
Woman:  I don't need a plumber. You're that clever shark, aren't you?
Voice:  [pause] Candygram.
Woman:  Candygram, my foot! You get out of here before I call the police! You're the shark, and you know it!
Voice:  Wait.  I-I'm only a dolphin, ma'am.
Woman:  A dolphin? Well...okay. [opens door]
[Huge latex and foam-rubber shark head lunges through open door, chomps down on woman's head, and drags her out of the apartment, as Jaws attack music plays.]

The Land Shark attack scenes are intermixed with other scenes directly spoofing Jaws, featuring Dan Aykroyd as Chief Brody and John Belushi as Matt Hooper.

Other appearances on SNL
The character returned in later episodes with the original cast, after which it did not appear for many years.
Season 1, Episode 6
Titled "Jaws III". The women  were played by regulars Laraine Newman, Jane Curtin, and Gilda Radner, and guest host Lily Tomlin, who is seen being attacked at the last minute. The shark was earlier heard attacking a newsman offscreen (voiced by long-time SNL announcer Don Pardo) reporting on the shark's reign of terror. As Tomlin's character is being attacked at the end, only  Aykroyd's self-absorbed, oblivious Brody is still alive.

Season 1, Episode 23
In the opening monologue with guest host Louise Lasser, the Land Shark attempts to lure Lasser out of her dressing room.

Season 2, Episode 6
In a sketch titled "Trick-or-Treating Land Shark", having lured Gilda Radner out of her home by claiming to be with UNICEF, the shark attacks her, then pops his head back through the doorway, opening its mouth to reveal Chevy Chase, who announces, "Live from New York, it's Saturday Night!" (the cold opening).

Season 2, Episode 22
Titled "Lucky Lindy", the shark meets aviator Charles Lindbergh, played by Buck Henry, on a transatlantic flight. Since Chase left the show after this season, the character did not return as a regular.

Season 3, Episode 11
Titled "No Funny Ending". The final sketch of the show; various sketch endings are attempted. Chevy Chase is guest star for this episode.

Season 3, Episode 19
Twice during the episode, host Richard Dreyfuss hears the Jaws theme. During the closing credits, he is finally attacked by the shark.

Season 8, Episode 1
Chevy Chase hosted the eighth season premiere on September 25, 1982, live via satellite from the West Coast (he was represented by a TV on the set which interacted with the other performers). He opened the show as the Land Shark, who attacked through the TV set.

Season 27, Episode 2
During Weekend Update, as Tina Fey introduces a segment about that year's spate of shark attacks, the Land Shark knocks at the door to the newsroom, then attacks Tina Fey. As Fallon closes the segment with "I'm Jimmy Fallon", Chase turns to the camera and replies, with a variation on his own former Weekend Update turn of phrase, "And I'm not. Good night, and have a pleasant tomorrow."

40th Anniversary Special
During the Weekend Update tribute with Tina Fey, Amy Poehler and Jane Curtin, a doorbell rings; Curtin, in terror, warns Fey not to open the door because of the Land Shark, but Fey dismisses her. Fey initially appears to be right: Matt Foley (played by Melissa McCarthy) appears, giving one of his traditional motivational speeches, but behind Foley is the Land Shark (this time played by Bobby Moynihan), who again attempts to eat Fey. Curtin and Poehler work to free Fey from the shark's jaws as the sketch closes.

Influence
The concept reportedly derives from the Monty Python's Flying Circus' sketch "Burglar/Encyclopedia Salesman".

References in popular culture
Though the Land Shark character appeared only irregularly on Saturday Night Live, it has entered the American cultural zeitgeist.  References to a "land shark" (often preceded by the word "candygram") can be found in movies, print, video games, and other places.  Often it is spelled as a solid compound, that is, as one word. In many forms of fiction, it is used as a name or nickname to a land-dwelling monster similar in appearance, temperament, or appetite to a shark.

 Jimmy Buffett's 1979 song "Fins" is based on the concept of "sharks that live on the land" preying on young women; in this case, the land sharks are in fact pick-up artists swarming in resort towns. Land Shark Lager was later named after the Buffett song.
 BMW featured the Land Shark (taken whole cloth from the original skit) in a commercial for the Z4 in 2003.
 In the 1993 movie Striking Distance, Bruce Willis' character says "Landshark" shortly before knocking out a drug dealer on a boat.
 In the computer game Warcraft III, the unit quotes for the Goblin Sappers include "Candygram", "Package for (mumble)", and "Flowers for (mumble)".
 In a 1989 episode of Chip 'n Dale Rescue Rangers titled "A Case of Stage Blight", an alligator with theatrical ambitions named "Sewernose de Bergerac" attempts to get an actor named Dudley to open the door to his dressing room with announcements of "Flowers", "Candygram", and finally "Singing telegram".
 The members of professional wrestling team D-Generation X announced themselves as a "candygram" and "land shark" as they attempted to get Jonathan Coachman to open a locked door on the October 2, 2006 episode of RAW.
 In the video game Sins of the Fathers, protagonist Gabriel Knight attempts to gain access to a character's home by using various door-to-door sales tactics.  When none of these are successful, he shouts "Landshark!" — to which the resident replies, apparently mistaking which SNL character actually played the creature in question, "You are no Bill Murray."
 In the 2000 video game Escape from Monkey Island, protagonist Guybrush Threepwood yells "Landshark!" when he sees shark jaw bones on an island shore.  The reputation for references to popular culture in the series makes it quite probable that this is allusion to the SNL skit.
 In The Adventures of Jimmy Neutron: Boy Genius episode "Return of the Nanobots", the Nanobots attempted to get into Jimmy's lab. Carl asked who was at the door and the Nanobots replied he had a telegram. Carl responded by saying that he wasn't falling for it, whereupon the Nanobots changed their offer to a llamagram (for which Carl proceed to open the door, only to get deleted by the Nanobots).
 In the movie Hoodwinked, the Wolf knocks on the door while saying "Hello, paper boy!... Publisher's, uh... Candygram!"
 In the game Dead to Rights 2, Jack Slate is asked to identify himself to a guard through a door, to which he replies "Landshark." and kicks in the door.
 In the 2008 movie August featuring Josh Hartnett, Hartnett's character is proprietor of a failing tech company called LandShark; he utilizes various sleights and ruses in attempt to gain clients and financing for his company.
 In the comic book Iron Man #138, Jim Rhodes and Tony Stark are sneaking into the compound of a company controlled by the Maggia when they duck into a room to avoid security guards. Unfortunately, the room is filled with thugs who demand to know who they are. Rhodes replies, "Uh, candygram for Mr. Mongo?" and Tony adds, "Land Shark?"
 In the beginning of the ninth episode of season 6 of the Gilmore Girls, Lorelai is locked out of her house by a security chain recently installed by her friend Luke. As she waits for him to open the front door to her house, she says, "Landshark! Candygram... Here's Johnny!" as an homage to both the SNL skit — and also to a scene from the Shining which itself referenced The Tonight Show Starring Johnny Carson.
 In Bill & Ted's Excellent Adventure, Abraham Lincoln is interrupted in the White House by a knock at his office door and someone saying, "Candygram." When Lincoln answers the door, he is grabbed suddenly by Genghis Khan.
 A picture of a land shark was etched into an Analog Devices AD1939 codec chip as chip art.
 The original name for the 90s western horror comedy cult classic Tremors was titled 'Land Shark', but it was renamed to 'Tremors' as the crew was worried that they would most likely get a lawsuit from  SNL.

See also
 Recurring Saturday Night Live characters and sketches

References

Saturday Night Live sketches
Saturday Night Live in the 1970s
Fictional sharks